The 2014 New York Yankees season was the 112th season for the New York Yankees franchise. The Yankees began the season on April 1 at Minute Maid Park against the Houston Astros, and finished on September 28 at Fenway Park against the Boston Red Sox. They finished in second place in the American League East with an 84–78 record, which was their worst record since 1992. The Yankees failed to make the playoffs for the second year in a row, and for the third time in twenty years.

The 2014 season is also notable for being team captain Derek Jeter's final season as a professional baseball player, also, beginning that year the team's radio broadcasts switched stations, being now aired via WFAN 660 AM and its FM simulcast WFAN-FM, which assumed the duty of being the new flagship radio stations for the Yankees Radio Network.

Off-season transactions 

On October 9, 2013, the Yankees agreed to a new contract with free agent manager Joe Girardi for four years and $16 million. At the time, the contract was the second most expensive contract for a manager behind Mike Scioscia of the Los Angeles Angels of Anaheim. On November 1, the Yankees announced they made a new deal with shortstop Derek Jeter for one year and $12 million over the original $9.5 million option in the original deal signed in 2010. Three weeks later, on November 18, the club announced they had reached a deal with free agent utility infielder Brendan Ryan originally reported to be for one year and worth $1 million. However, on December 2, the club and Ryan both announced that the deal was for two years and $5 million with a mutual option for 2016. The same day, the Yankees non-tendered utility infielder Jayson Nix, third baseman David Adams and pitcher Matt Daley, who all became free agents. On December 3, the Yankees announced that the first of their high-profile signings, former Atlanta Braves catcher Brian McCann had made a five-year, $85 million deal official. The deal also had a vesting option for a sixth year worth $15 million. Just hours prior to the deal, the club traded catcher Chris Stewart to the Pittsburgh Pirates for a player to be named later. Just two days later, the Yankees held a press conference for the signing of McCann, who would wear number 34 in honor of Eric O'Flaherty and Derek Lowe, former teammates on the Braves. 

On December 3, just hours after the McCann signing was made official, it was reported that the Yankees had agreed to a deal with former Boston Red Sox outfielder Jacoby Ellsbury for seven years and $153 million. The deal, which contained an option for 2021, was announced on December 7, after Ellsbury passed a physical. A press conference to unveil Ellsbury was held planned on December 13. On December 4, the Yankees announced they had reached a deal with free agent utility player Kelly Johnson for one year and $3 million. On December 6, former Yankee and free agent Robinson Canó accepted a ten-year, $240 million deal with the Seattle Mariners with a full no-trade clause. The deal to leave the Yankees was the third largest in big league history, behind Alex Rodriguez's deals with the Yankees in 2007 and the Texas Rangers in 2000 and tied Albert Pujols's $240 million deal with the Angels. Later that day, Curtis Granderson, a member of the club from 2010–2013, was announced to join the New York Mets on a four-year, $60 million deal.

While Cano and Granderson left the Yankees on December 6, the Yankees also made two signings on that date; the team reached a one-year, $16 million deal with pitcher Hiroki Kuroda,  which became official the following day. Also on December 6, the Yankees reached an agreement to sign free agent outfielder Carlos Beltrán on a three-year, $45 million deal. On December 13, the Yankees introduced Ellsbury at a press conference, adorning the number 22. Four days later, the Yankees announced a pair of signings, bringing infielder Brian Roberts to the Bronx on a one-year, $2 million deal, along with reliever Matt Thornton on a two-year, $7.5 million contract. On December 19, the Yankees contract with Beltran became official, and the Yankees introduced him to the public at a press conference the next day. In order to make room on the roster, Brett Marshall was designated for assignment on December 19, and claimed by the Chicago Cubs off waivers four days later. On January 10, 2014, the Yankees made the Thornton signing official, and in order to clear room on the roster, the Yankees designated Vernon Wells for assignment. On January 11, a panel of three, led by Major League Baseball arbitrator Fredric Horowitz, announced that the group had decided 2–1 to reduce the suspension on Alex Rodriguez from 211 games to 162 games and the postseason. The next day, the Yankees signed infielder Scott Sizemore to a minor league deal, with an invitation to Spring training. On January 14, the Yankees announced in a press release that the deal with Brian Roberts was made official, taking Alex Rodriguez's vacated space on the 40-man roster.

On January 22, 2014, it was announced that the Yankees had agreed to a deal with free agent/Rakuten Golden Eagles starting pitcher Masahiro Tanaka. The seven-year, $155 million deal which contains an opt-out clause at the 2017–2018 offseason was made official the same day, as the Yankees chose to not have Tanaka take a physical examination. In order to make room on the roster, left-handed pitcher David Huff was designated for assignment. On January 24, the San Francisco Giants announced that they had acquired Huff off waivers for cash considerations. On February 11, the Yankees held a press conference for Tanaka, in front of over 200 members of the media, including reporters from Japan, marking the biggest press conference for the Yankees since the one held for Hideki Matsui in 2003. A day later, Derek Jeter announced on his Facebook page that he would retire after the 2014 season. At a press conference held on February 19, Jeter mentioned that the decision was not about the injury he sustained in the 2012 American League Championship Series but that he felt it was time to move on.

After the beginning of spring training on February 14, the Yankees reportedly signed free agent relief pitcher Andrew Bailey to a minor league deal on February 22. On February 24, the Yankees announced that they had extended outfielder Brett Gardner to a 4-year, $52 million deal, which would keep him on the Yankees until 2018 with a club option for 2019.

The Yankees began the 2014 season without longtime starting pitcher Andy Pettitte and longtime closer Mariano Rivera, each of whom retired following the 2013 season.

Regular season 
The Yankees unexpectedly designated Eduardo Núñez for assignment in order to call up Yangervis Solarte on April 1, only hours before the Yankees would begin their season at Minute Maid Park, home of the Houston Astros. 
The newly acquired pitcher from Japan, Masahiro Tanaka made his Major League debut and Yankees debut on April 4 against the Toronto Blue Jays at the Rogers Centre.

Hosting the Boston Red Sox on April 10, pitcher Michael Pineda earned a win for the Yankees over their rivals. However, the game sparked a controversy as analysts were quick to discover a foreign substance, most likely pinetar, on Pineda's neck. The Red Sox chose not to appeal it but Major League Baseball agreed to talk to the Yankees organization about it. In Pineda's defense, the pitcher claimed he had dirt on his hand. The substance, which was discovered in the third inning, disappeared by the fifth inning.

On April 17, pitcher CC Sabathia earned a win on the road against the Tampa Bay Rays 10–2; during the game, Sabathia was on the mound for the third time witnessing a triple play as Sean Rodriguez bounced a ball to Yangervis Solarte (playing third base). The play was turned 5–4–3.

A few days later, during a terrible outing against the Rays, Iván Nova felt discomfort in his right arm. Nova would later be confirmed to be undergoing successful season-ending surgery.

On April 23, Michael Pineda started another game against the Red Sox. This game was away at Fenway Park. Not unlike the start against the Boston Red Sox on April 10, Pineda had another foreign substance on his body. Shockingly, it was a large amount of the substance on his neck. This occurred in the second inning, as the Red Sox manager John Farrell decided to appeal against the pitcher. As a result, umpire Gerry Davis examined the substance on Michael Pineda's neck. The substance was indeed pine tar, an illegal foreign substance. Thus, Davis immediately ejected Michael Pineda from the game and Pineda was put on a 10-game suspension. The controversy triggered analysts to discuss the possibility of Major League Baseball changing the rules and making a small amount of pine tar available for pitchers to use in very cold weathers to gain a grip on the ball. However, the substance wouldn't be allowed in decent weather. Analysts believe the rule, if looked into, could be made effective as of the 2015 season. Pineda took responsibility for cheating, however, and claimed that he would learn from his mistake.

On May 20 in a 1–6 loss to the Chicago Cubs, Masahiro Tanaka picked up his first regular season loss in professional baseball since 2012. He went 34–0 during this streak.

Through June 18, the Yankees led the majors with a 20–11 record in games decided by two runs or fewer.

The team has been plagued by lack of offense.

A crisis surrounding CC Sabathia struck the Yankees within the first few days of July. Sabathia, who was rumored to be progressing greatly in his rehab stint in the minors (coming back from an injury suffered in the month of May), unexpectedly awoke one morning to find his knee swollen quite seriously. As a result, Sabathia is scheduled to meet Dr. James Andrews on July 14. Manager Joe Girardi confirmed that Sabathia's season is most likely over. After the All Star Game, Sabathia's season was confirmed to be over as he would be undergoing knee surgery performed by the Los Angeles Dodgers's physician and would not return until 2015.

In early July, Alfonso Soriano was designated for assignment and later released by the Yankees after the struggling outfielder and designated hitter failed to break out of his hitting slump. Soriano proved to spend almost all of his part of the season failing to produce both offensively and defensively. A few days before, the highly perceived Yangervis Solarte was also optioned back to the Minors due to his obtained confidence issues that resulted because of an offensive slump. He was recalled back to the Majors not long after.

On July 6, the Yankees acquired right handed pitcher Brandon McCarthy from the Arizona Diamondbacks for left handed pitcher Vidal Nuño.

On July 3, Derek Jeter, Masahiro Tanaka, and Dellin Betances were all named American League All-Stars. Koji Uehara of the Boston Red Sox was selected to replace Tanaka on the All Star roster.

After an outing against the Cleveland Indians on July 8, the fourth of the original five starting rotation pitchers was put on the disabled list. Masahiro Tanaka, who was a most valuable asset to the Yankees and an All-Star, complained about feeling discomfort in his pitching elbow to the Yankees. As a result, Tanaka was flown to New York City from Cleveland to get an MRI. He was quickly sent to Seattle to get examined as the most efficient doctors were all engaged in a meeting in Seattle. It was announced that Tanaka had partially torn his collateral ligament in his right elbow. None of the doctors who met with Tanaka suggested Tommy John surgery and instead a more subtle rehab was suggested for the pitcher. This would take six weeks to complete before returning to the mound. Masahiro Tanaka was leading the Majors in wins. He was also on pace to contend for American League Rookie of the Year, the American League Cy Young Award, and possibly even the American League MVP. With the injury, Hiroki Kuroda was the last standing starter and became the Yankees ace.

As a result of the injuries to all the starting pitchers, GM Brian Cashman pursued trades with other organizations in hopes to acquire replacement starters. As a result, Cashman acquired Brandon McCarthy from Arizona and Jeff Francis from the Oakland Athletics. Francis was later designated for assignment.

On July 22, at 12:01 AM, Jack Curry reported that a deal between the Yankees and San Diego Padres had been confirmed that sent Yangervis Solarte and minor league right-handed pitcher Rafael De Paula to San Diego in exchange for third basemen Chase Headley and cash considerations.

Before the trade deadline at 4:00 EST on July 31, the Yankees' general manager Brian Cashman made a few moves to bolster the Yankees offense. The Yankees traded prospect Peter O'Brien to Arizona for Martín Prado. Also, for the first time since 1997, the Yankees made a trade with the very active Boston Red Sox that sent Kelly Johnson to Boston for Stephen Drew. Earlier that day, the Yankees acquired pitcher Esmil Rogers from Toronto via claiming him off from waivers after he was designated for assignment by Toronto. The Yankees unconditionally released Scott Sizemore to make room for Rogers. The Yankees designated Brian Roberts to make room for Stephen Drew. Drew would replace Roberts at second base, a position he has never played before at the professional level (including the Minors). Drew claimed he last played second base as a sophomore in high school for a varsity team.

After Masahiro Tanaka began his rehab and strengthening programs in late August so he could come back and pitch before the end of season, he was sent back to New York City on August 29 with arm soreness.  He later returned in September, but he finished the season 13–5.

Derek Jeter ended up finishing his career in style including a walk off RBI win against the Baltimore Orioles at home and a big performance against the Red Sox at Fenway Park to finish the season.

In Derek Jeter's final game he finished his career with a RBI infield single at Fenway Park to drive in Ichiro Suzuki and was taken out of the game after his hit. The Yankees went on to win 9 to 5.

The Yankees did not make the playoffs for the second year in a row, as they failed to produce enough the last month of the season.

Roster

Opening Day lineup

Season standings

American League East

American League Wild Card

Record vs. opponents

Game log

|- align="center" bgcolor="ffbbbb"
| 1 || April 1 || @ Astros || 2–6 || Feldman (1–0) || Sabathia (0–1) || || 42,117 || 0–1
|- align="center" bgcolor="ffbbbb"
| 2 || April 2 || @ Astros || 1–3 || Cosart (1–0) || Kuroda (0–1) || Fields (1) || 23,145 || 0–2
|- align="center" bgcolor="bbffbb"
| 3 || April 3 || @ Astros || 4–2 || Nova (1–0) || Oberholtzer (0–1) || Robertson (1) || 26,348 || 1–2
|- align="center" bgcolor="bbffbb"
| 4 || April 4 || @ Blue Jays || 7–3 || Tanaka (1–0) || McGowan (0–1) || || 48,197 || 2–2
|- align="center" bgcolor="ffbbbb"
| 5 || April 5 || @ Blue Jays || 0–4 || Dickey (1–1) || Pineda (0–1) || Santos (2) || 45,446 || 2–3
|- align="center" bgcolor="bbffbb"
| 6 || April 6 || @ Blue Jays || 6–4 || Sabathia (1–1) || Hutchison (1–1) || Robertson (2) || 34,067 || 3–3
|- align="center" bgcolor="bbffbb"
| 7 || April 7 || Orioles || 4–2 || Kuroda (1–1) || Jiménez (0–2) || Kelley (1) || 48,142 || 4–3
|- align="center" bgcolor="ffbbbb"
| 8 || April 8 || Orioles || 5–14 || Chen (1–1) || Nova (1–1) || || 35,864 || 4–4
|- align="center" bgcolor="ffbbbb"
| 9 || April 9 || Orioles || 4–5 || Matusz (1–0) || Kelley (0–1) || Hunter (3) || 39,412 || 4–5
|- align="center" bgcolor="bbffbb"
| 10 || April 10 || Red Sox || 4–1 || Pineda (1–1) || Buchholz (0–1) || Phelps (1) || 42,821 || 5–5
|- align="center" bgcolor="ffbbbb"
| 11 || April 11 || Red Sox || 2–4 || Lester (1–2) || Sabathia (1–2) || Mujica (1) || 44,121 || 5–6
|- align="center" bgcolor="bbffbb"
| 12 || April 12 || Red Sox || 7–4 || Kuroda (2–1) || Lackey (2–1) || Kelley (2) || 48,572 || 6–6
|- align="center" bgcolor="bbffbb"
| 13 || April 13 || Red Sox || 3–2 || Nova (2–1) || Doubront (1–2) || Kelley (3) || 46,081 || 7–6
|- align="center" bgcolor="bbbbbb"
| -- || April 15 || Cubs || colspan=6| PPD, RAIN; rescheduled for April 16
|- align="center" bgcolor="bbffbb"
| 14 || April 16 || Cubs || 3–0 || Tanaka (2–0) || Hammel (2–1) || Kelley (4) || 36,569 || 8–6
|- align="center" bgcolor="bbffbb"
| 15 || April 16 || Cubs || 2–0 || Pineda (2–1) || Wood (0–2) || Warren (1) || 40,073 || 9–6
|- align="center" bgcolor="bbffbb"
| 16 || April 17 || @ Rays || 10–2 || Sabathia (2–2) || Price (2–1) || || 28,085 || 10–6 
|- align="center" bgcolor="ffbbbb"
| 17 || April 18 || @ Rays || 5–11 || McGee (1–0) || Warren (0–1) || || 26,079 || 10–7
|- align="center" bgcolor="ffbbbb"
| 18 || April 19 || @ Rays || 1–16 || Archer (2–1) || Nova (2–2) || || 30,159 || 10–8
|- align="center" bgcolor="bbffbb"
| 19 || April 20 || @ Rays || 5–1 (12) || Claiborne (1–0) || Bell (0–1) || || 26,462 || 11–8
|- align="center" bgcolor="bbffbb"
| 20 || April 22 || @ Red Sox || 9–3 || Tanaka (3–0) || Lester (2–3) || || 37,041 || 12–8
|- align="center" bgcolor="ffbbbb"
| 21 || April 23 || @ Red Sox || 1–5 || Lackey (3–2) || Pineda (2–2) || || 37,015 || 12–9
|- align="center" bgcolor="bbffbb"
| 22 || April 24 || @ Red Sox || 14–5 || Sabathia (3–2) || Doubront (1–3) || || 37,356 || 13–9
|- align="center" bgcolor="ffbbbb"
| 23 || April 25 || Angels || 1–13 || Wilson (3–2) || Kuroda (2–2) || || 38,358 || 13–10
|- align="center" bgcolor="bbffbb"
| 24 || April 26 || Angels || 4–3 || Betances (1–0) || Santiago (0–4) || Robertson (3) || 40,908 || 14–10
|- align="center" bgcolor="bbffbb"
| 25 || April 27 || Angels || 3–2 || Warren (1–1) || Kohn (1–1) || Robertson (4) || 40,028 || 15–10
|- align="center" bgcolor="ffbbbb"
| 26 || April 29 || Mariners || 3–6 || Young (1–0) ||Sabathia (3–3) || || 37,484 || 15–11
|- align="center" bgcolor="bbbbbb"
| -- || April 30 || Mariners || colspan=6| PPD, RAIN; rescheduled for June 2
|-

|- align="center" bgcolor="ffbbbb"
| 27 || May 1 || Mariners || 2–4 || Elías (2–2) || Kuroda (2–3) || Rodney (6) || 43,121 || 15–12
|- align="center" bgcolor="ffbbbb"
| 28 || May 2 || Rays || 5–10 (14) || Bell (1–1) || Leroux (0–1) || || 33,580 || 15–13
|- align="center" bgcolor="bbffbb"
| 29 || May 3 || Rays || 9–3 || Tanaka (4–0) || Lueke (0–2) || || 43,325 || 16–13
|- align="center" bgcolor="ffbbbb"
| 30 || May 4 || Rays || 1–5 || Bédard (1–1) || Sabathia (3–4) || || 41,122 || 16–14
|- align="center" bgcolor="ffbbbb"
| 31 || May 5 || @ Angels || 1–4 || Weaver (3–2) || Kelley (0–2) || Frieri (3) || 39,701 || 16–15
|- align="center" bgcolor="bbffbb"
| 32 || May 6 || @ Angels || 4–3 || Kelley (1–2) || Frieri (0–3) || Robertson (5) || 40,106 || 17–15
|- align="center" bgcolor="bbffbb"
| 33 || May 7 || @ Angels || 9–2 || Nuño (1–0) || Santiago (0–6) || || 44,083 || 18–15
|- align="center" bgcolor="bbffbb"
| 34 || May 9 || @ Brewers || 5–3 || Tanaka (5–0) || Gallardo (2–2) || Robertson (6) || 40,123 || 19–15
|- align="center" bgcolor="ffbbbb"
| 35 || May 10 || @ Brewers || 4–5 || Duke (3–0) || Aceves (0–1) || Rodríguez (15) || 43,085 || 19–16
|- align="center" bgcolor="ffbbbb"
| 36 || May 11 || @ Brewers || 5–6 || Rodríguez (1–0) || Warren (1–2) || || 43,544 || 19–17
|- align="center" bgcolor="ffbbbb"
| 37|| May 12 || Mets || 7–9 || Mejía (4–0) || Thornton (0–1) || Farnsworth (3) || 46,517 || 19–18
|- align="center" bgcolor="ffbbbb"
| 38 || May 13 || Mets || 7–12 || Matsuzaka (1–0) || Nuño (1–1) || || 45,958 || 19–19
|- align="center" bgcolor="bbffbb"
| 39 || May 14 || @ Mets || 4–0 || Tanaka (6–0) || Montero (0–1) || || 35,577 || 20–19
|- align="center" bgcolor="bbffbb"
| 40 || May 15 || @ Mets || 1–0 || Betances (2–0) || deGrom (0–1) || Robertson (7) || 40,133 || 21–19
|- align="center" bgcolor="bbbbbb"
| -- || May 16 || Pirates || colspan=6| PPD, RAIN; rescheduled for May 18
|- align="center" bgcolor="bbffbb"
| 41 || May 17 || Pirates || 7–1 || Phelps (1–0) || Vólquez (1–4) || || 47,353 || 22–19
|- align="center" bgcolor="bbffbb"
| 42 || May 18 || Pirates || 4–3 || Kuroda (3–3) || Morton (0–6) || Robertson (8) || 46,858 || 23–19
|- align="center" bgcolor="ffbbbb"
| 43 || May 18 || Pirates || 3–5 || Cole (4–3) || Aceves (0–2) || Melancon (6) || 46,858 || 23–20
|- align="center" bgcolor="ffbbbb"
| 44 || May 20 || @ Cubs || 1–6 || Hammel (5–2) || Tanaka (6–1) || || 38,753 || 23–21
|- align="center" bgcolor="bbffbb"
| 45 || May 21 || @ Cubs || 4–2 (13) || Claiborne (2–0) || Veras (0–1) || Robertson (9) || 34,808 || 24–21
|- align="center" bgcolor="ffbbbb"
| 46 || May 22 || @ White Sox || 2–3 || Sale (4–0) || Phelps (1–1) || Belisario (2) || 21,677 || 24–22
|- align="center" bgcolor="ffbbbb"
| 47 || May 23 || @ White Sox || 5–6 || Webb (4–0) || Robertson (0–1) || || 27,091 || 24–23
|- align="center" bgcolor="bbffbb"
| 48 || May 24 || @ White Sox || 4–3 (10) || Betances (3–0) || Putnam (2–1) || Robertson (10) || 33,413 || 25–23
|- align="center" bgcolor="bbffbb"
| 49 || May 25 || @ White Sox || 7–1 || Tanaka (7–1) || Rienzo (4–1) || || 39,142 || 26–23
|- align="center" bgcolor="bbffbb"
| 50 || May 26 || @ Cardinals || 6–4 (12) || Aceves (1–2) || Choate (0–2) || Robertson (11) || 47,311 || 27–23
|- align="center" bgcolor="ffbbbb"
| 51 || May 27 || @ Cardinals || 0–6 || Lynn (6–2) || Phelps (1–2) || || 45,202 || 27–24
|- align="center" bgcolor="bbffbb"
| 52 || May 28 || @ Cardinals || 7–4 || Kuroda (4–3) || Miller (6–4) || || 45,267 || 28–24
|- align="center" bgcolor="ffbbbb"
| 53 || May 30 || Twins || 1–6 || Nolasco (3–5) || Nuño (1–2) || || 42,245 || 28–25
|- align="center" bgcolor="bbffbb"
| 54 || May 31 || Twins || 3–1 || Tanaka (8–1) || Duensing (1–2) || Robertson (12) || 44,346 || 29–25
|-

|- align="center" bgcolor="ffbbbb"
| 55 || June 1 || Twins || 2–7 || Hughes (6–1) || Robertson (0–2) || || 42,449 || 29–26
|- align="center" bgcolor="ffbbbb"
| 56 || June 2 || Mariners || 2–10 || Hernández (8–1) || Phelps (1–3) || || 41,539 || 29–27
|- align="center" bgcolor="ffbbbb"
| 57 || June 3 || Athletics || 2–5 (10) || Otero (5–1) || Warren (1–3) || Doolittle (6) || 41,667 || 29–28
|- align="center" bgcolor="ffbbbb"
| 58 || June 4 || Athletics || 4–7 || Chavez (5–3) || Ramírez (0–1) || Doolittle (7) || 37,734 || 29–29
|- align="center" bgcolor="bbffbb"
| 59 || June 5 || Athletics || 2–1 || Tanaka (9–1) || Pomeranz (5–3) || Robertson (13) || 44,346 || 30–29
|- align="center" bgcolor="bbffbb"
| 60 || June 6 || @ Royals || 4–2 || Whitley (1–0) || Guthrie (2–6) || Robertson (14) || 23,418 || 31–29
|- align="center" bgcolor="ffbbbb"
| 61 || June 7 || @ Royals || 4–8 || Crow (3–1) || Phelps (1–4) || || 26,991 || 31–30
|- align="center" bgcolor="ffbbbb"
| 62 || June 8 || @ Royals || 1–2 || Shields (7–3) || Kuroda (4–4) || Holland (18) || 24,614 || 31–31
|- align="center" bgcolor="bbbbbb"
| -- || June 9 || @ Royals || colspan=6| PPD, RAIN; rescheduled for August 25
|- align="center" bgcolor="bbffbb"
| 63 || June 10 || @ Mariners || 3–2 || Betances (4–0) || Iwakuma (4–3) || Robertson (15) || 28,405 || 32–31
|- align="center" bgcolor="bbffbb"
| 64 || June 11 || @ Mariners || 4–2 || Tanaka (10–1) || Young (5–4) || || 28,434 || 33–31
|- align="center" bgcolor="bbffbb"
| 65 || June 12 || @ Mariners || 6–3 || Whitley (2–0) || Elías (5–5) || Robertson (16) || 40,596 || 34–31
|- align="center" bgcolor="bbffbb"
| 66 || June 13 || @ Athletics || 7–0 || Phelps (2–4) || Gray (6–3) || || 36,067 || 35–31
|- align="center" bgcolor="ffbbbb"
| 67 || June 14 || @ Athletics || 1–5 || Kazmir (8–2) || Kuroda (4–5) || || 36,067 || 35–32
|- align="center" bgcolor="ffbbbb"
| 68 || June 15 || @ Athletics || 5–10 || Chavez (6–4) || Nuño (1–3) || || 36,067 || 35–33
|- align="center" bgcolor="bbffbb"
| 69 || June 17 || Blue Jays || 3–1 || Tanaka (11–1) || Stroman (3–2) || Robertson (17) || 41,834 || 36–33
|- align="center" bgcolor="bbffbb"
| 70 || June 18 || Blue Jays || 7–3 || Whitley (3–0) || Buehrle (10–4) || || 41,342 || 37–33
|- align="center" bgcolor="bbffbb"
| 71 || June 19 || Blue Jays || 6–4 || Phelps (3–4) || Hutchison (5–5) || Warren (2) || 40,169 || 38–33
|- align="center" bgcolor="bbffbb"
| 72 || June 20 || Orioles || 5–3 || Huff (2–0)  ||  Britton (3–1) || || 46,197 || 39–33
|- align="center" bgcolor="ffbbbb"
| 73 || June 21 || Orioles || 1–6 || Norris (7–5) || Nuño (1–4) || || 47,165 || 39–34
|- align="center" bgcolor="ffbbbb"
| 74 || June 22 || Orioles || 0–8 || Tillman (6–4) || Tanaka (11–2) || || 47,493 || 39–35
|- align="center" bgcolor="ffbbbb"
| 75 || June 23 || @ Blue Jays || 3–8 || Stroman (4–2) || Whitley (3–1) || || 31,554 || 39–36
|- align="center" bgcolor="ffbbbb"
| 76 || June 24 || @ Blue Jays || 6–7 || Janssen (2–0) || Warren (1–4) || || 34,206 || 39–37
|- align="center" bgcolor="bbffbb"
| 77 || June 25 || @ Blue Jays || 5–3 || Kuroda (5–5) || Hutchison (5–6)  || Robertson (18) || 34,710 || 40–37
|- align="center" bgcolor="bbffbb"
| 78 || June 27 || Red Sox || 6–0 || Nuño (2–4) || Workman (1–1) || || 48,522 || 41–37
|- align="center" bgcolor="ffbbbb"
| 79 || June 28 || Red Sox || 1–2 || Lester (9–7) || Tanaka (11–3) || Uehara (17) || 48,433 || 41–38
|- align="center" bgcolor="ffbbbb"
| 80 || June 29 || Red Sox || 5–8 || Lackey (9–5) || Whitley (3–2) || Uehara (18) || 48,124 || 41–39
|- align="center" bgcolor="ffbbbb"
| 81 || June 30 || Rays || 3–4 (12) || Boxberger (1–1) || Ramírez (0–2) || || 36,052 || 41–40
|-

|- align="center" bgcolor="ffbbbb"
| 82 || July 1 || Rays || 1–2 || Price (7–7) ||Kuroda (5–6) ||Balfour (11) || 35,866 || 41–41
|- align="center" bgcolor="ffbbbb"
| 83 || July 2 || Rays || 3–6 || Odorizzi (4–7) ||Nuño (2–5) ||Boxberger (1) || 42,343 || 41–42
|- align="center" bgcolor="bbffbb"
| 84 || July 3 || @ Twins || 7–4 || Tanaka (12–3) || Hughes (8–5) || Robertson (19) || 34,714 || 42–42
|- align="center" bgcolor="bbffbb"
| 85 || July 4 || @ Twins || 6–5 || Huff (3–0) || Gibson (7–7) || Robertson (20) || 36,952 || 43–42
|- align="center" bgcolor="ffbbbb"
| 86 || July 5 || @ Twins || 1–2 (11) || Duensing (2–2) || Thornton (0–2) || || 36,514 || 43–43
|- align="center" bgcolor="bbffbb"
| 87 || July 6 || @ Twins || 9–7 || Kuroda (6–6) || Nolasco (5–7) || Robertson (21) || 31,171 || 44–43
|- align="center" bgcolor="bbffbb"
| 88 || July 7 || @ Indians || 5–3 || Greene (1–0) || Masterson (4–6) || Betances (1) || 21,558 || 45–43
|- align="center" bgcolor="ffbbbb"
| 89 || July 8 || @ Indians || 3–5 || Bauer (3–4) || Tanaka (12–4) || Allen (22) || 23,384 || 45–44
|- align="center" bgcolor="bbffbb"
| 90 || July 9 || @ Indians || 5–4 (14) || Whitley (4–2) || Pestano (0–1) || Robertson (22) || 21,727 || 46–44
|- align="center" bgcolor="ffbbbb"
| 91 || July 10 || @ Indians || 3–9 || Carrasco (2–3) || Thornton (0–3) || || 28,334 || 46–45
|- align="center" bgcolor="ffbbbb"
| 92 || July 11 || @ Orioles || 2–3 (10) || McFarland (3–2) || Warren (1–5) || || 45,389 || 46–46
|- align="center" bgcolor="bbffbb"
| 93 || July 12 || @ Orioles || 3–0 || Greene (2–0) || Tillman (7–5) || Robertson (23) || 46,667 || 47–46
|- align="center" bgcolor="ffbbbb"
| 94 || July 13 || @ Orioles ||  1–3 (5) ||  Gausman (4–2) || Whitley (4–3) || || 34,483 || 47–47
|- style="text-align:center;"
|colspan="10" style="background:#bbcaff;"|All-Star Break: AL defeats NL 5–3
|- align="center" bgcolor="bbffbb"
| 95 || July 18 || Reds || 4–3 || Phelps (4–4) || Leake (7–8) || Robertson (24) || 47,372 || 48–47
|- align="center" bgcolor="bbffbb"
| 96 || July 19 || Reds || 7–1 || McCarthy (4–10) || Simón (12–4) || || 47,606 || 49–47
|- align="center" bgcolor="bbffbb"
| 97 || July 20 || Reds || 3–2 || Robertson (1–2) || Chapman (0–3) || || 43,115 || 50–47
|- align="center" bgcolor="ffbbbb"
| 98 || July 21 || Rangers || 2–4 || Mikolas (1–2) || Greene (2–1) || Soria (17) || 45,278 || 50–48
|- align="center" bgcolor="bbffbb"
| 99 || July 22 || Rangers || 2–1 (14) || Francis (1–2) || Tepesch (3–6) || || 37,669 || 51–48
|- align="center" bgcolor="| 100 || July 23 || Rangers || 2–1 (5) || Phelps(5-4) ||Darvish (9-6)  || 37,669 || 52-48
|- align="center" bgcolor="bbffbb"
| 100 || July 23 || Rangers || 2–1 (5) || Phelps (5–4) || Darvish (9–6) || || 37,585 || 52–48
|- align="center" bgcolor="bbffbb"
| 101 || July 24 || Rangers || 4–2 || McCarthy (5–10) || Lewis (6–8) || Robertson (25) || 45,105 || 53–48
|- align="center" bgcolor="bbffbb"
| 102 || July 25 || Blue Jays || 6–4 || Kuroda (7–6) || Buerhrle (10–7) || Robertson (26) || 44,237 || 54–48
|- align="center" bgcolor="ffbbbb"
| 103 || July 26 || Blue Jays || 4–6 || Hutchison (7–9) || Kelley (1–3) || || 46,166 || 54–49
|- align="center" bgcolor="ffbbbb"
| 104 || July 27 || Blue Jays || 4–5 || Sanchez (1–0) || Robertson (1–3) || Janssen (16) || 45,063 || 54–50
|- align="center" bgcolor="ffbbbb"
| 105 || July 28 || @ Rangers || 2–4 || Darvish (10–6) || Phelps (5–5) || Feliz (2) || 44,508 || 54–51
|- align="center" bgcolor="bbffbb"
| 106 || July 29 || @ Rangers || 12–11 || McCarthy (6–10) || Martinez (1–7) || Robertson (27) || 41,934 || 55–51
|- align="center" bgcolor="ffbbbb"
| 107 || July 30 || @ Rangers || 2–3 || Lewis (7–8) || Kuroda (7–7) || Feliz (3) || 46,599 || 55–52
|-

|- align="center" bgcolor="ffbbbb"
| 108 || August 1 || @ Red Sox || 3–4 || Ranaudo (1–0) || Capuano (1–2) || Uehara (22) || 37,782 || 55–53
|- align="center" bgcolor="bbffbb"
| 109 || August 2 || @ Red Sox || 6–4 || Kelley (2–3) || Webster (1–1) || Robertson (28) || 37,302 || 56–53
|- align="center" bgcolor="bbffbb"
| 110 || August 3 || @ Red Sox || 8–7 || Rogers (1–0) || Breslow (2–3) || Robertson (29) || 38,035 || 57–53
|- align="center" bgcolor="bbffbb"
| 111 || August 4 || Tigers || 2–1 || McCarthy (7–10) || Scherzer (13–4) || Robertson (30) || 41,603 || 58–53
|- align="center" bgcolor="ffbbbb"
| 112 || August 5 || Tigers || 3–4 (12) || Soria (2–4) || Daley (0–1) || Nathan (23) || 40,078 || 58–54
|- align="center" bgcolor="bbffbb"
| 113 || August 6 || Tigers || 5–1 || Warren (2–5) || Verlander (10–10) || || 40,067 || 59–54
|- align="center" bgcolor="bbffbb"
| 114 || August 7 || Tigers || 1–0 || Greene (3–1) || Porcello (13–6) || Robertson (31) || 47,013 || 60–54
|- align="center" bgcolor="bbffbb"
| 115 || August 8 || Indians || 10–6 || Rogers (2–0) || Bauer (4–7) || || 43,972 || 61–54
|- align="center" bgcolor="ffbbbb"
| 116 || August 9 || Indians || 0–3 || Kluber (13–6) || McCarthy (7–11) || Allen (15) || 47,376 || 61–55
|- align="center" bgcolor="ffbbbb"
| 117 || August 10 || Indians || 1–4 || Carrasco (4–4) || Kuroda (7–8) || || 46,152 || 61–56
|- align="center" bgcolor="ffbbbb"
| 118 || August 11 || @ Orioles || 3–11 || Norris (10–7) || Capuano (1–3) || || 34,018 || 61–57
|- align="center" bgcolor="bbbbbb"
| -- || August 12 || @ Orioles || colspan=6| PPD, RAIN; rescheduled for September 12
|- align="center" bgcolor="ffbbbb"
| 119 || August 13 || @ Orioles || 3–5 || O'Day (5–1) || Kelley (2–4) || Britton (25) || 37,587 || 61–58
|- align="center" bgcolor="ffbbbb"
| 120 || August 15 || @ Rays || 0–5 || Cobb (8–6) || McCarthy (7–12) || || 26,535 || 61–59
|- align="center" bgcolor="bbffbb"
| 121 || August 16 || @ Rays || 3–2 || Betances (5–0) || McGee (3–1) || Robertson (32) || 31,042 || 62–59
|- align="center" bgcolor="bbffbb"
| 122 || August 17 || @ Rays || 4–2 || Kuroda (8–8) || Hellickson (1–2) || Robertson (33) || 28,812 || 63–59
|- align="center" bgcolor="ffbbbb"
| 123 || August 19 || Astros || 4–7 || Fields (3–6) || Robertson (1–4) || Qualls (14) || 40,015 || 63–60
|- align="center" bgcolor="ffbbbb"
| 124 || August 20 || Astros || 2–5 || Feldman (7–9) || Huff (3–1) || Veras (1) || 42,102 || 63–61
|- align="center" bgcolor="bbffbb"
| 125 || August 21 || Astros || 3–0 || McCarthy (8–12) || Keuchel (10–9) || || 41,767 || 64–61
|- align="center" bgcolor="bbffbb"
| 126 || August 22 || White Sox || 4–3 || Robertson (2–4) || Webb (5–4) || || 43,811 || 65–61
|- align="center" bgcolor="bbffbb"
| 127 || August 23 || White Sox || 5–3 || Kuroda (9–8) || Carroll (5–8) || Robertson (34) || 47,594 || 66–61
|- align="center" bgcolor="bbffbb"
| 128 || August 24 || White Sox || 7–4 (10) || Huff (4–1) || Petricka (0–3) || || 43,366 || 67–61
|- align="center" bgcolor="bbffbb"
| 129 || August 25 || @ Royals || 8–1 || Pineda (3–2) || Shields (12–7) || || 31,756 || 68–61
|- align="center" bgcolor="ffbbbb"
| 130 || August 26 || @ Tigers || 2–5 || Porcello (15–8) || McCarthy (8–13) || Nathan (28) || 40,488 || 68–62
|- align="center" bgcolor="bbffbb"
| 131 || August 27 || @ Tigers || 8–4 || Greene (4–1) || Price (12–10) || || 40,876 || 69–62
|- align="center" bgcolor="ffbbbb"
| 132 || August 28 || @ Tigers || 2–3 || Coke (2–2) || Kelley (2–5) || || 42,647 || 69–63
|- align="center" bgcolor="bbffbb"
| 133 || August 29 || @ Blue Jays || 6–3 || Capuano (2–3) || Buehrle (11–9) || Robertson (35) || 43,318 || 70–63
|- align="center" bgcolor="ffbbbb"
| 134 || August 30 || @ Blue Jays || 0–2 || Hutchison (9–11) || Pineda (3–3) || Sanchez (1) || 45,863 || 70–64
|- align="center" bgcolor="ffbbbb"
| 135 || August 31 || @ Blue Jays || 3–4 || Happ (9–8) || McCarthy (8–14) || Janssen (20) || 45,678 || 70–65
|-

|- align="center" bgcolor="ffbbbb"
| 136 || September 2 || Red Sox || 4–9 || Kelly (3–3) || Greene (4–2) || || 40,334 || 70–66
|- align="center" bgcolor="bbffbb"
| 137 || September 3 || Red Sox || 5–1 || Kuroda (10–8) || Ranaudo (3–1) || || 40,007 || 71–66
|- align="center" bgcolor="bbffbb"
| 138 || September 4 || Red Sox || 5–4 || Warren (3–5) || Uehara (6–5) || || 44,708 || 72–66
|- align="center" bgcolor="ffbbbb"
| 139 || September 5 || Royals || 0–1 || Shields (13–7) || Pineda (3–4) || Davis (1) || 36,284 || 72–67
|- align="center" bgcolor="bbffbb"
| 140 || September 6 || Royals || 6–2 || McCarthy (9–14) || Hendriks (1–1) || || 45,262 || 73–67
|- align="center" bgcolor="ffbbbb"
| 141 || September 7 || Royals || 0–2 || Ventura (12–9) || Greene (4–3) || Davis (2) || 48,110 || 73–68
|- align="center" bgcolor="ffbbbb"
| 142 || September 9 || Rays || 3–4 || Archer (9–8) || Kuroda (10–9) || McGee (17) || 31,188 || 73–69
|- align="center" bgcolor="bbffbb"
| 143 || September 10 || Rays || 8–5 || Claiborne (3–0) || Odorizzi (10–12) || || 31,591 || 74–69
|- align="center" bgcolor="bbffbb"
| 144 || September 11 || Rays || 5–4 || Kelley (3–5) || McGee (4–2) || || 32,627 || 75–69
|- align="center" bgcolor="ffbbbb"
| 145 || September 12 || @ Orioles || 1–2 (11) || Brach (7–1) || Warren (3–6) || || 31,871 || 75–70
|- align="center" bgcolor="ffbbbb"
| 146 || September 12 || @ Orioles || 0–5 || Norris (13–8) || Mitchell (0–1) || || 43,707 || 75–71
|- align="center" bgcolor="bbffbb"
| 147 || September 13 || @ Orioles || 3–2 || Greene (5–3) || González (9–8) || Robertson (36) || 44,231 || 76–71
|- align="center" bgcolor="ffbbbb"
| 148 || September 14 || @ Orioles || 2–3 || O'Day (5–1) || Robertson (2–5) || || 43,947 || 76–72
|- align="center" bgcolor="ffbbbb"
| 149 || September 15 || @ Rays || 0–1 || Peralta (3–4) || Kelley (3–6) || || 16,058 || 76–73
|- align="center" bgcolor="ffbbbb"
| 150 || September 16 || @ Rays || 1–6 || Odorizzi (11–12) || Pineda (3–5) || || 21,387 || 76–74
|- align="center" bgcolor="bbffbb"
| 151 || September 17 || @ Rays || 3–2 || McCarthy (10–14) || Cobb (9–8) || Robertson (37) || 26,332 || 77–74
|- align="center" bgcolor="bbffbb"
| 152 || September 18 || Blue Jays || 3–2 || Robertson (3–5) || Sanchez (2–2) || || 34,279 || 78–74
|- align="center" bgcolor="bbffbb"
| 153 || September 19 || Blue Jays || 5–3 || Kuroda (11–9) || Buehrle (12–10) || Warren (3) || 40,059 || 79–74
|- align="center" bgcolor="ffbbbb"
| 154 || September 20 || Blue Jays || 3–6 || Stroman (11–6) || Capuano (2–4) || Janssen (24) || 47,292 || 79–75
|- align="center" bgcolor="bbffbb"
| 155 || September 21 || Blue Jays || 5–2 || Tanaka (13–4) || Hutchison (10–13) || Robertson (38) || 48,144 || 80–75
|- align="center" bgcolor="bbffbb"
| 156 || September 22 || Orioles || 5–0 || Pineda (4–5) || Chen (16–5) || || 35,614 || 81–75
|- align="center" bgcolor="ffbbbb"
| 157 || September 23 || Orioles || 4–5 || Jiménez (6–9) || McCarthy (10–15) || Britton (36)  || 43,201 || 81–76
|- align="center" bgcolor="ffbbbb"
| 158 || September 24 || Orioles ||5–9 || Norris (15–8) || Greene (5–4) || || 46,056 || 81–77
|- align="center" bgcolor="bbffbb"
| 159 || September 25 || Orioles || 6–5 || Robertson (4–5) || Meek (0–4) || || 48,613 || 82–77
|- align="center" bgcolor="bbffbb"
| 160 || September 26 || @ Red Sox || 3–2 || Capuano (3–4) || Wright (0–1) || Robertson (39) || 37,605 || 83–77
|- align="center" bgcolor="ffbbbb"
| 161 || September 27 || @ Red Sox || 4–10 || Kelly (6–4) || Tanaka (13–5) || || 37,147 || 83–78
|- align="center" bgcolor="bbffbb"
| 162 || September 28 || @ Red Sox || 9–5 || Pineda (5–5) || Buchholz (8–11) || || 36,879 || 84–78
|-

Farm system

References

External links
 2014 New York Yankees season at Baseball-Reference.com
 2014 New York Yankees Schedule and Statistics at MLB.com

New York Yankees seasons
New York Yankees
New York Yankees
2010s in the Bronx